Gale Edwards  (born 14 November 1954) is an Australian theatre director, who has worked extensively throughout Australia and internationally. She has also directed for television and film.

Professional career
Edwards began her career at Adelaide youth theatre company Energy Connection.  From 1986 to 1989 she was Associate Director of the State Theatre Company of South Australia, has been an Artistic Director of the Melbourne Theatre Company, she has worked with every other major Australian theatre company, including the Sydney Theatre Company and Opera Australia.

Internationally, Edwards directed the 1996 London revival of Jesus Christ Superstar, which opened on Broadway in 2000, and for which she won an Emmy Award for the televised recording of the production.

Edwards contributed to the book of the musical Whistle Down the Wind, for which she directed the West End production. She directed Shakespeare's The Merchant of Venice and A Midsummer Night's Dream at the Chichester Festival Theatre in 2003 and 2004 respectively.

Edwards has directed for the Royal Shakespeare Company and Shakespeare Theatre Company (Washington D.C.). She directed the premiere production of The Boy from Oz.

She co-wrote the book and lyrics of the musical Eureka, which premiered in Melbourne in 2004.

Edwards'credits directing for film and television include the 2011 Australian film A Heartbeat Away and the "Pride" segment of 1993 television series Seven Deadly Sins, as well as filmed versions of stage presentations.

Awards
Edwards has been the recipient of three Sydney Critics Circle Awards, four Melbourne Green Room Awards (most recently for her 2012 production of Chess for The Production Company), an Emmy, two Helpmann Awards (Best Direction of a Musical for The Boy From Oz and Sweeney Todd), a Sydney Critics Award, two nominations for Helen Hayes Awards in Washington D.C., and a 2000 Centenary Medal 'for Service to Australian Society'.

Edwards was made a Member of the Order of Australia (AM) in the 2017 Queen's Birthday Honours.

Mo Awards
The Australian Entertainment Mo Awards (commonly known informally as the Mo Awards), were annual Australian entertainment industry awards. They recognise achievements in live entertainment in Australia from 1975 to 2016. Gale Edwards won two awards in that time.
 (wins only)
|-
| 1992
| Gale Edwards
| Outstanding Contribution to Musical Theatre
| 
|-
| 1999
| Gale Edwards
| Outstanding Contribution to Musical Theatre
| 
|-

References

1954 births
Living people
Australian theatre directors
Helpmann Award winners
Members of the Order of Australia